The Lieutenant of the Duchy of Aquitaine was an officer charged with governing the Duchy of Aquitaine on behalf of the King of England. Unlike the seneschalcy of Gascony, the lieutenancy was not a permanent office. Lieutenants were appointed in times of emergency, due either to an external threat or internal unrest. The lieutenant had quasi-viceregal authority and so was usually a man of high rank, usually English and often of the royal family.

Aquitaine, a grand fief in southwestern France, was a possession of the English crown from 1154, when the Duke of Aquitaine and Gascony inherited the English throne, until it was finally conquered by the French at the end of the Hundred Years' War (1453).

List of lieutenants
1248–1254 Simon de Montfort
1269–1270 Roger of Leybourne
1272 Thomas de Clare
1278 Otton de Grandson jointly with Robert Burnel
1287–1288 William of Middleton, also seneschal
1289 Maurice VI de Craon
1293–1294 John de Saint-John
1294; 1310–1311 John of Brittany
1295–1296 Edmund of Lancaster, who died in 1296
1296–1297 Henry de Lacy, acting lieutenant from 1295
1298–1299 Gui Ferre
1299–1302 Barrau de Sescas jointly with Pey-Arnaut de Vic
1302–1304; 1309–11 John Hastings, also seneschal
1312 John de Ferrers, also seneschal
1312–1313 Estèbe Ferréol, also seneschal
1324–1325 Edmund of Woodstock
1338–1341 Bernard Ezi II d'Albret jointly with (1) Oliver Ingham (also seneschal) and then (2) Hugues de Genève
1344 Richard FitzAlan jointly with Henry of Grosmont
1345–1347; 1349 Henry of Grosmont, alone
1352–1355 Ralph Stafford
1355–1357 Edward the Black Prince, later Prince of Aquitaine (1362–72)
1360–1362 John Chandos
1370–1371 John of Gaunt, later Duke of Aquitaine (1390–1399)
1372 John Hastings
1378–1381 John Neville
1388–1389 John of Gaunt
1394–1398 Henry "Hotspur" Percy
1398 John Beaufort
1401–1403 Edward of Norwich
1412–1413 Thomas of Lancaster
1413 Thomas Beaufort
1439–1440 John Holland
1443 John Beaufort, did not act
1452–1453 John Talbot
1453 William Bonville

Notes

Lists of office-holders in England
Lists of people by location
Aquitaine
Lists of office-holders in France